The Marxists is a 1962 book about Marxism by the sociologist C. Wright Mills.


Reception
The political scientist David McLellan praised The Marxists, calling its account of Karl Marx's ideas acute.

References

Footnotes

Bibliography

 

1962 non-fiction books
American non-fiction books
Books about Marxism
Books by C. Wright Mills
English-language books